Thakurganj Assembly constituency is an assembly constituency in Kishanganj district in the Indian state of Bihar.

Overview
As per Delimitation of Parliamentary and Assembly constituencies Order, 2008, No 53 Thakurganj Assembly constituency is composed of the following: Thakurganj community development block; Singhimari, Lohagarha, Satkauwa, Dighalbank, Dhantola, Karuamani, Mangra, Jagir Padampur, Tarabari Padampur, Ikra, Dahibhat, Atgachhia and Tulshia gram panchayats of Dighalbank CD Block.

Thakururganj Assembly constituency is part of No 10 Kishanganj (Lok Sabha constituency).

Members of Bihar Legislative Assembly 
Following is the list of Members of Legislative Assembly from Thakurganj Assembly Constituency.

Election results

1977–2010
In the November 2010 state assembly elections, Naushad Alam of LJP won the Thakurganj assembly seat defeating his nearest rival Gopal Kumar Agarwal of JD(U). Contests in most years were multi cornered but only winners and runners up are being mentioned. Gopal Kumar Agarwal of SP defeated Dr. Md. Jawaid Congress October 2005. Dr. Md. Jawaid of Congress defeated Tara Chand Dhanuka of SP in February 2000. Sikander Singh of BJP defeated Dr. Md. Jawaid of Congress in 1995. Md. Suleman of JD defeated Md. Husen Azad of Congress in 1990. Md. Husen Azad of Congress defeated Md. Suleman of JP in 1985 and of Janata Party (JP) in 1980. Md. Suleman of JP defeated Md. Husen Azad of Congress in 1977.

2020

References

External links
 

Assembly constituencies of Bihar
Politics of Kishanganj district